Miss Universe Philippines 2023 will be the fourth edition of the Miss Universe Philippines competition. The coronation night will be held on May 13, 2023, at the SM Mall of Asia Arena in Bay City, Pasay, Metro Manila, Philippines.

Silvia Celeste Cortesi of Pasay will crown her successor at the end of the event. The winner will represent the Philippines at the Miss Universe 2023 competition, which is scheduled to be held in El Salvador at the end of 2023.

Background

Location and date
On March 3, 2023, the organization announced that the coronation will be on May 13, 2023 to be held at the SM Mall of Asia Arena in Bay City, Pasay, Metro Manila, Philippines.

Selection of participants
On November 7, 2022, the organization launched its search for the next Filipina who will represent the Philippines at the Miss Universe 2023 competition. Online applications were initially set until January 29, 2023. However, it was moved twice—first to February 5, 2023 and later to February 14, 2023. On-site applications were done from February 13–17, 2023. The final selection and the initial 40 contestants were subsequently named on February 18, 2023.

On September 2022, the Miss Universe organization announced changes to its rules, allowing women to join the pageant regardless of marital status, beginning in 2023. The national pageant followed suit, opening its applications to Filipino citizens aged 18 to 27, regardless of the applicant's civil status and height.

Withdrawals 
Among the initial 40 contestants, one contestant withdrew prior to the competition. Due to health concerns, Miss Pangasinan, Evangeline Fuentes, withdrew from the competition after being announced as part of the Top 40. In light of this, the organization announced the inclusion of Miss Apayao, Kristeen Mae Boccang as one of the official Top 40 candidates as a replacement to Fuentes.Another candidate, Miss Davao del Norte, Dianne Refugio, also withdrew from the competition, citing personal reasons. Meanwhile, Miss Mandaue, Breanna Marie Evans, was disqualified or was forced to pull-out from the competition after a leaked conversation showing mean-spirited comments towards Celeste Cortesi, the reigning Miss Universe Philippines.

New titles
The Miss Universe Philippines Organization teased the addition of two new titles in this edition leading to polarized reactions on social media.

Contestants
The following 38 contestants will be competing for the three titles:

Notes

References

External links

 

2023 beauty pageants
2023 in the Philippines
Beauty pageants in the Philippines
2023